Pink String and Sealing Wax is a 1945 British drama film directed by Robert Hamer and starring Mervyn Johns. It is based on a play with the same name by Roland Pertwee. It was the first feature film Robert Hamer directed on his own.

The title derives from the practice of pharmacists in the Victorian and Edwardian age of wrapping drugs in a package sealed with pink string and sealing wax to show the package had not been tampered with.

Plot

The film is set in Brighton around 1880.

The editor of the Brighton Herald newspaper dictates a story to his secretary regarding a local murder, which is to be the first to be investigated by the new public analyst, pharmacist Mr Sutton. He will be giving evidence at the trial. Mr Sutton is then seen giving a woman a neat package of pills, sealed with pink string and sealing wax.

A judge dons his black cap and sentences the woman who was seen in the pharmacy to be hanged until dead. Mr Sutton (Mervyn Johns) is cheered by this verdict and heads home. He enters his shop to see his son David (Gordon Jackson) who has been left in charge of the pharmacy in his absence. At home his daughter Victoria asks to be allowed to train as a professional singer. Her father refuses, and tells her instead to teach piano to the children of his customers. His other daughter is distraught that he plans to dissect several guinea pigs in an experiment. He blocks David's engagement until he can support himself. His wife chastises his harsh approach and points out that the children are starting to be secretive.

David goes to a pub, The Dolphin, to drown his sorrows with whisky. Two women next to him are gossiping about the landlord's wife, Pearl, and her liaison with a local man, Dan Powell. The landlord hears and asks them to stop discussing his wife. Outside, Dan meets Pearl and kisses her passionately. Dan enters the pub and chats to the two women at the bar. The landlord, Joe, is drunk and demands she stop the relationship. Meanwhile at the bar, Dan's girlfriend tells Pearl to keep away.

David is tipsy and leaves to look at the sea and nearby pier and bumps into Pearl and engages her in conversation. She takes his arm and starts to walk with him. David gets home and is helped to bed by his sisters, Victoria and Peggy. They try to see Madame Patti, an opera singer, to get tips on how to begin a singing career. They wait outside the stage door. Victoria gains the singer's attention by singing "There's No Place Like Home". Madame Patti invites them to supper, and arranges for Victoria to attend an audition at the Royal College of Music in London. Victoria and Peggy manage to collect enough money to pay for Victoria's train fare to London. Their father chastises Peggy for feeding his guinea pigs and says her pocket money will be donated to the enlightenment of the poor in Bible classes. The family attend church and Sutton complains about the sermon being too short.

David meets Pearl and walks her to a cafe to meet "a friend". The friend is Dan who sits drinking beer with Pearl. Joe strikes Pearl after Dan's girlfriend complains about Pearl and Dan at the bar. Pearl goes to the pharmacy to treat a cut she got from Joe. David tends her and warns her of tetanus. He discusses the poisons on the shelf. Pearl steals some poison while he is out of the room. Pearl returns to the bar and Frank, the barman, says Joe is collapsed drunk upstairs. Pearl cuts Joe's hand with a cut-throat razor while he sleeps.

Victoria attends the audition.

Dan comes into the Dolphin with the attractive Mrs Webster on his arm. Pearl is annoyed. Staff comment that they have not seen Joe for some days. When Pearl eventually plucks up courage to poison him, she is shocked by the ferocity of his death. She locks the door but then bashes on it saying "Let me in". Dan and others arrive. A doctor pronounces Joe dead. The doctor thinks it is tetanus from the cut.

When the telegram comes, saying Victoria has been accepted and has won a three year scholarship giving £30 per year, her father refuses to allow her to accept. He says he will turn her out of the house if she accepts. Mrs Sutton threatens to leave him if he does not let Victoria pursue a singing career.

A Landau carriage brings Pearl back from Joe's funeral. She kisses Dan in her parlour. David arrives and tries to chat her up but she laughs him off.

The two women (Dan's old girlfriend and the gossip) discuss the whole affair and conclude Joe's hand was not cut during his fight with Pearl. The police arrive and inform Pearl that her husband is to be exhumed for a post mortem. Pearl confesses to Dan that she used strychnine. Dan decides it can be blamed on David. She goes to Mr Sutton and says David gave her the poison but said it was to "put Joe off the drink". She says Mr Sutton can lie at the inquest in order to save his son. Sutton spots that Joe could not have locked the door whilst in the agonies of being poisoned. After questioning David, Mr Sutton goes to Pearl and tells her the whole thing has been told to the police. She weeps, but Dan shows little sympathy.

Pearl wanders in a daze to the outer edge of the promenade and throws herself off a cliff.

Cast

Release
The film premiered in London on 3 December 1945 at the Tivoli Cinema on The Strand and the Marble Arch Pavilion. The critic in The Times praised Googie Withers and Gordon Jackson for their roles, and concluded that Robert Hamer, "has made, in spite of occasional lapses and longueurs, a promising beginning as a director."

References

External links
 
 
 
 

1945 films
1940s crime thriller films
1945 drama films
British crime thriller films
British drama films
British black-and-white films
Films set in Brighton
Films set in the 19th century
Ealing Studios films
Films directed by Robert Hamer
Films produced by Michael Balcon
Poisoning in film
1950s English-language films
1940s English-language films
1940s British films
1950s British films